Gijs Brouwer (born 14 March 1996) is an American-born Dutch tennis player.

Brouwer has a career high ATP singles ranking of World No. 116 achieved on 20 February 2023. He also has a career high doubles ranking of World No. 148 achieved on 22 August 2022.

Brouwer has won two ATP Challenger doubles titles at the 2021 Puerto Vallarta Open with Reese Stalder and at 2022 Tallahassee Challenger with Christian Harrison.

Career

2022: ATP & Major debut & top-50 win, top 150 in singles & doubles
On his ATP Tour debut at the 2022 U.S. Men's Clay Court Championships in Houston, Brouwer as a qualifier, made the quarterfinals after beating Feliciano López and JJ Wolf. He lost to third seed Reilly Opelka in the quarterfinals. As a result he made his top 300 debut at world No. 286.

In May, he reached his first Challenger final at the 2022 Tunis Open losing to Roberto Carballes.

He made his Grand Slam debut at the US Open as a qualifier. He recorded his first Major win defeating world No. 45 Adrian Mannarino. He reached the top 150 in the singles rankings on 12 September 2022.

2023: Second ATP quarterfinal & first top-10 win, top 125 
Ranked No. 160, after the withdrawal of Gaël Monfils, Brouwer wildcard was promoted into the main draw Rotterdam, where he defeated top-50 player Marc-Andrea Hüsler in the first round. He moved on to his first hard court quarterfinal after fourth seed Holger Rune retired in the second set of the match, his biggest, first top-10 win, and only his fifth on the ATP tour. As a result he moved more than 40 positions to a new career high in the top 120 at No. 116 on 20 February 2023. It was the first time a Dutch duo, Brouwer and Tallon Griekspoor, reached the quarterfinals of the home tournament, since Raemon Sluiter and Sjeng Schalken in 2003.

Challenger and Future Finals

Singles: 1 (0–1)

Doubles: 3 (2–1)

Record against top 10 players

Wins over top 10 players
Brouwer has a  record against players who were, at the time the match was played, ranked in the top 10.

References

External links
 
 

1996 births
Living people
Dutch male tennis players
Sportspeople from Houston